"Ask Me" is a 1964 song by Elvis Presley. It is an English-language cover version of the Italian song "Io"  by Domenico Modugno.

In 1964 Elvis Presley released his version on a single with "Ain't That Loving You Baby" on the other side.

The recording appeared on the 1968 RCA Victor compilation Elvis' Gold Records Volume 4.

Writing and recording history 
The song is credited to Domenico Modugno (the author of the original), Bernie Baum, Bill Giant and Florence Kaye.

Track listing 
7" single
 "Ain't That Loving You Baby" (2:20) — Elvis Presley
 "Ask Me" (2:07) — Elvis Presley with The Jordanaires

Charts

References

External links 
 Elvis Presley - Ain't That Loving You Baby / Ask Me at Discogs

1964 songs
1964 singles
Elvis Presley songs
RCA Records singles
Songs written by Domenico Modugno
Songs written by Bernie Baum
Songs written by Bill Giant
Songs written by Florence Kaye